Polygonatum verticillatum or whorled Solomon's-seal is a plant species of the genus Polygonatum. It is widespread in Europe and also in China and the Himalayas though not reported from large sections of western and Central Asia in between those two ranges.

References

External links
 
 

verticillatum
Flora of Europe
Flora of temperate Asia
Garden plants of Asia
Garden plants of Europe
Plants described in 1753
Taxa named by Carl Linnaeus